Red-Letter Christians constitute a non-denominational movement within Christianity. "Red-Letter" refers to New Testament verses and parts of verses printed in red ink, to indicate the words attributed to Jesus without the use of quotations.

History
While many Christians throughout church history have defined themselves as emphasizing the teachings of Jesus, this modern movement was initiated by Jim Wallis and Tony Campolo in 2007. They believe Christians should be paying attention to Jesus' words and example by promoting biblical values such as peace, building strong families, the elimination of poverty, and other important social justice issues.

According to Campolo, "The purpose of this gathering was not to create a religious left movement to challenge the religious right, but to jump-start a religious movement that will transcend partisan politics."  Campolo has released a book to help explain this, called Red Letter Christians, A Citizen's Guide to Faith and Politics (Regal Books, February 2008).

The most prominent figures associated with the movement are Jim Wallis, Shane Claiborne and Tony Campolo.

See also

References

External links
 
 Official podcast

Christian theological movements
Christian ethics
Christian terminology